Runt-related transcription factor 3 is a protein that in humans is encoded by the RUNX3 gene.

Function 

This gene encodes a member of the runt domain-containing family of transcription factors. A heterodimer of this protein and a beta subunit forms a complex that binds to the core DNA sequence 5'-YGYGGT-3' found in a number of enhancers and promoters, and can either activate or suppress transcription. It also interacts with other transcription factors. It functions as a tumor suppressor, and the gene is frequently deleted or transcriptionally silenced in cancer. Multiple transcript variants encoding different isoforms have been found for this gene.

In melanocytic cells RUNX3 gene expression may be regulated by MITF.

Knockout mouse 

Runx3 null mouse gastric mucosa exhibits hyperplasia due to stimulated proliferation and suppressed apoptosis in epithelial cells, and the cells are resistant to TGF-beta stimulation.

The RUNX3 controversy 

In 2011 serious doubt was cast over the tumor suppressor function of Runx3 originated from the earlier publication by Li and co-workers.
On the basis of the original study by Li and co-workers (2002), the majority of later literature citing Li and co-workers (2002) assumed that RUNX3 was expressed in the normal gut epithelium and that it is therefore likely to act as a tumor suppressor in the particular epithelial cancer investigated. Most of this literature used RUNX3 promoter methylation status in various cancers as a proxy for its expression. However, quite many genes are known to be methylated in tumor cell genomes, and the majority of these genes are not expressed in the normal tissue of origin of these cancers. Others used poorly characterized (or fully invalidated) antibodies to detect the RUNX3 protein, or used RT-PCR or validated antibodies and failed to detect RUNX3 in the gut epithelium but still did not question the original finding by Li and co-workers (2002). This facts have recently been discussed in a book by Ülo Maiväli.

Interactions 

RUNX3 has been shown to interact with TLE1.

See also 
 Core binding factor
RUNX1
RUNX2

References

Further reading

External links 
 

Transcription factors